The Mandarin Oriental, Hong Kong is a five-star hotel on Connaught Road Central in Central, Hong Kong, owned and managed by Mandarin Oriental Hotel Group.

History

Construction of the hotel on the site of the colonial Queen's Building on the waterfront in Central Hong Kong was announced on July 9, 1960, with the name Queen's Hotel. On August 24, 1962, the South China Morning Post reported that the unfinished hotel's name had been changed to The Mandarin, because "a nationwide survey of the United States seeking American reaction to the hotel name shows that the American public, who comprised the major­ity of this Colony’s tourists, preferred the exotic-sounding Mandarin." The topping off ceremony was held on March 28, 1963. The cost of construction was HK$42 million, and HK$66 million was spent on interior decoration. John Howarth, of the Leigh & Orange architectural firm, designed the building, while the interior was designed by Don Ashton.

The Mandarin opened to the public on September 1, 1963 and celebrated its grand opening on October 24, 1963. The hotel was managed by Intercontinental Hotels from its opening until 1974. At 26 storeys, it was the tallest building in Hong Kong. It was the first hotel in Hong Kong to have direct dial phones and the first in Asia to include a bath in every guestroom. The Mandarin was originally adjacent to Victoria Harbour, but as a result of extensive land reclamation in the waterfront area, the harbour is now several blocks away. In 1988, it was renamed the Mandarin Oriental. In 2003, the hotel was the site of the suicide of actor and singer Leslie Cheung, who jumped from the 26th storey of the building. In 2005 the hotel underwent a US$150 million renovation.

Facilities
The hotel contains 501 guestrooms, 67 of which are suites, overlooking Victoria Harbour. There are ten restaurants and bars. The Michelin-starred Pierre, Chef Pierre Gagnaire's first restaurant in Hong Kong, closed in 2020. An event space can accommodate up to 600 people.

See also

 Mandarin Oriental Hotel Group
 List of tallest buildings in Hong Kong

References

External links

 Mandarin Oriental, Hong Kong

Mandarin Oriental Hotel Group
Central, Hong Kong
Landmarks in Hong Kong
Hotels in Hong Kong
Hotels established in 1963
Hotel buildings completed in 1963
Michelin Guide starred restaurants in Hong Kong
1963 establishments in Hong Kong